Berezhnytsia is a village in Sarny Raion, Rivne Oblast, Ukraine, but was formerly administered within Dubrovytsia Raion. As of the year 2001, the community had 646 residents. The postal code for the village is 34164, and the KOATUU code is 5621882001.

References

External links 
 Article Bereźnica in the Geographical Dictionary of the Kingdom of Poland, Volume XV (Abablewo — Januszowo), 1900 year 
 Weather in the Berezhnytsia 
 

Volhynian Governorate
Wołyń Voivodeship (1921–1939)
Populated places established in 1629
1629 establishments in the Polish–Lithuanian Commonwealth

Villages in Sarny Raion